BC Žalgiris-2 is the reserve team of the professional basketball club Žalgiris Kaunas. The club is based in Kaunas, Lithuania. The team currently competes in the Lithuanian second division Nacionalinė Krepšinio Lyga. They play their home games at the Žalgiris training facility, which is also home to some young players that come from outside of Kaunas.

Titles
Junior EuroLeague Champion: 2003, 2007
NKL Champion: 2008
NKL Runner-up: 2016, 2018
NKL Third place: 2012, 2013
LKAL Champion: 2003
Runner-up of Junior EuroLeague: 2005, 2006, 2011
LKAL Bronze Medal Winner: 2000, 2002

Roster

Notable players

Highest achievements are noted at the top:

NBA
 Martynas Andriuškevičius 2003-2004
 Donatas Motiejūnas 2005-2007

LKL
 Valdas Dabkus 2001-2002
 Vytenis Jasikevičius 2013–2014
 Vaidas Čepukaitis 2007-2008; 2010-2011
 Tauras Jogėla 2008–2012
 Gediminas Maceina  2002–2004
 Žygimantas Skučas  2010–2012

EuroLeague
 Povilas Butkevičius 2004-2006
 Vytenis Čižauskas 2007-2008, 2010-2011
 Vilmantas Dilys 2003-2005, 2007-2008
 Tomas Dimša 2011-2013
 Artūras Gudaitis 2012-2013
 Giedrius Gustas 1999-2000
 Žygimantas Janavičius 2007-2008
 Paulius Jankūnas 2002-2003
 Adas Juškevičius 2005-2008
 Mantas Kalnietis 2003-2006
 Mindaugas Kupšas  2010–2011
 Vytenis Lipkevičius  2006–2008

 Jonas Mačiulis 2002-2004
 Artūras Milaknis 2006-2007
 Darius Šilinskis 2000-2002
 Vladimir Štimac 2005-2006, 2007
 Siim-Sander Vene 2006-2008
 Kaspars Vecvagars 2010-2011
 Justas Tamulis 2011-2014
 Lukas Lekavičius 2012-2014
 Donatas Tarolis 2013-2014
 Vaidas Kariniauskas  2010–2013
 Edgaras Ulanovas 2010-2011
 Marius Grigonis 2009-2013
 Rokas Jokubaitis 2016-2019

External links
Official Site 

Basketball teams in Lithuania
2000 establishments in Lithuania
National Basketball League (Lithuania) teams
Basketball in Kaunas